The Battle of the Duisburg Convoy, also known as the Battle of the BETA Convoy, was fought on the night of  1941 between an Italian convoy, its escorts and four British ships.

Force K of the Royal Navy, based at Malta, annihilated the convoy, sinking all the merchant ships and the destroyer  with no loss and almost no damage. The   was sunk next day by the British submarine , while picking up survivors.

Italian attempts to reduce the risk of interception by British forces, by sending individual ships, pairs and smaller convoys from several ports at once was futile, because the British were reading Italian naval codes; the next convoy was forced to return to port.

Background

Italian belligerence
The declaration of war by Italy on 10 June 1940 placed the Italian Royal Air Force astride the traditional British sea route to Indian Ocean ports through the Mediterranean and Suez Canal in Egypt. The Italian Royal Navy roughly trebled the numbers of battleships, cruisers and submarines available to the Axis against the Royal Navy. The British had held the eastern end of the Mediterranean and France the western end but on 25 June 1940 the fall of France ended the participation of the French Navy in the Allied domination of the Mediterranean. The British based Force H at Gibraltar, the Mediterranean Fleet at Alexandria in Egypt and used the island of Malta in the central Mediterranean as base of operations. In September 1940, the Italian invasion of Egypt took place from Italian Libya (ASI) leading to the capture of Sidi Barrani. The Italian Army invaded Greece the following October.

1940–1941

In early November 1940, the Italian offensive in Greece had been defeated and the Italian battleships ,  and  had been damaged by Royal Navy torpedo bombers at the Battle of Taranto. The ship losses of the Italian Fleet had made it easier for the British to supply Malta and Greece. The Axis forces involved the Western Desert Campaign were supplied across the Mediterranean by convoys from Italy to the ASI. Tripoli was the main  of the colony, which had lesser ports to the east, including Benghazi. The normal wartime route for Italian supply deliveries to Libya went about  westwards around Sicily and then hugged the coast from Tunisia eastwards to Tripoli, to evade British aircraft, ships and submarines from Malta.

In early 1941, after Operation Compass, the big British and Commonwealth victory in Egypt and Cyrenaica, the best-equipped units in the British XIII Corps were sent to Greece as part of Operation Lustre to assist the Greek Army against the Italian invaders and to be ready to meet an anticipated German invasion. Adolf Hitler responded to the Italian disaster in Egypt with Directive 22 (11 January 1941) ordering  (Operation Sunflower), the deployment of a new  (DAK) to Libya, as a barrier detachment. The DAK had fresh troops with better tanks, equipment and air support than the surviving Italian forces in the ASI. The Axis force raided and quickly defeated the British at El Agheila on 24 March and at Mersa el Brega on 31 March, exploited the success and by 15 April, had pushed the British back to the Libyan–Egyptian border at Sollum and besieged the small Libyan port of Tobruk. Several Axis attempts to seize Tobruk failed and the front line settled on the Egyptian border into November 1941.

Malta
Loaded Axis ships sailing to Africa accounted for 90 per cent of the losses and the Malta-based squadrons were responsible for about 75 per cent of ships sunk by aircraft. In October 1941 the British re-established (Force K) a flotilla of surface ships at Malta for the first time since April, plus a detachment of Fairey Swordfish torpedo bombers. Italian air reconnaissance discovered the ships on 21 October and cancelled sailings for Tripoli, leaving only the inferior facilities at Benghazi.

Prelude

Duisburg (BETA) Convoy operation

The convoy consisted two German vessels, SS Duisburg 7,889 gross register tonnage (GRT) and SS San Marco (3,113 GRT) and the Italian MV Maria (6,339 GRT), SS Sagitta (5,153 GRT) and MV Rina Corrado (5,180 GRT), carrying 389 vehicles,  of munitions, fuel in barrels and troops for the Italian and German forces in Libya. The tankers Conte di Misurata (7,599 GRT) and Minatitlan (5,014 GRT) carried  of fuel. A powerful escort was arranged for the convoy operation to counter Force K, the British flotilla recently based at Malta.

Close Escort (Captain Ugo Bisciani) [Ship data from O'Hara (2009) unless indicated]
  destroyers
 
 
 
  destroyer
  ( Mario Milano)
  destroyer
  ( Giuseppe Cigala Fulgosi)
  destroyer
 

Distant Escort (Vice Admiral Bruno Brivonesi) [Ship data from O'Hara (2009) unless indicated]
 3rd Cruiser Division: s  and 
 13th Destroyer Flotilla s
 
 
 
 

The convoy was routed to the east of Malta, since the airfields in Libya were under Axis occupation, rather than the usual west and along the Tunisian coast.

Force K
Force K (Captain William Agnew) consisted of two light cruisers with six 6-inch guns in twin turrets each and two treble 21-inch torpedo tubes. Two destroyers from Force H, with four twin 4-inch guns each and two quadruple 21-inch torpedo tubes, joined Force K at Malta. Intended to fight at night, all of the ships were equipped with radar and the cruisers had new searchlights with better performance.

  light cruisers [data from Greene and Massignani (2002) unless indicated]
  (flagship)
 
 L-class destroyers

Battle

7 November

The Duisburg (BETA) Convoy, the 51st German–Italian sailing since 8 February departed from Naples on 7 November and Force K sailed the next day, forewarned by the British success in decyphering Italian signals concerning Axis shipping movements in the Mediterranean. A British reconnaissance aircraft was dispatched to "find" the convoy as camouflage.

8/9 November
There was slight moonlight to the east and the British ships took up position with the moon silhouetting the convoy. Agnew was under instructions to attack the nearest escorts first and then fire on the convoy, dealing with the other escorts as they appeared. As the ships closed with the convoy, radar detected more ships, assumed to be destroyers and escorts but actually the distant escort.

Grecale was hit by the first three salvoes from Aurora; Lance and the 4-inch secondary armament of Aurora bombarded a merchant ship. Penelope engaged Maestrale, the leader of the close escort and was on target with the first salvoes and Lively began to shell the merchant ships three minutes afterwards. At first, the Italians thought that they were under air attack and the wireless mast of Maestrale was hit. Fulmine attacked but was soon severely damaged by British gunfire, Milano losing an arm but remaining in command until the ship sank. Grecale was hit and came to a stop outside torpedo range and was later towed back to port by Oriani. Euro, undamaged, came within  of the British ships but mistook them for Trieste and Trento, aided by the ships not firing on Euro. Maestrale had been signalling for Italian ships to rally on the port (far) side of the convoy, leading to Cigala countermanding an order to launch torpedoes. Moments later, British ships opened fire but Euro was no longer in a position to attack with torpedoes. Six British shells hit Euro but at such short range they passed through without exploding, killing about twenty members of the crew.

The distant escort was on the right-hand side of the convoy, steaming twice as fast, zig-zagging to keep station and also thought that the convoy was under air attack. At  Brivonesi signalled to  that torpedo bombers were attacking and then sailed for the point where the British ships had first been sighted, instead of their current position. When watchmen on Trieste saw the arc of shells and ships beginning to burn, the distant escort was about  distant at the end of its zig-zag away from the convoy. As the escort closed on the convoy the British ships moved beyond the glare of the burning ships and became much harder to identify. From  the British engaged the Axis merchant ships with shell and torpedo, the ships taking little evasive action. The close escort on the east side of the convoy moved off with Maestrale and Euro to rally and then attacked again, the Italian salvoes having no effect and the ships then being driven off. The distant escort sighted the British again and fired 207  rounds, managing to straddle some of the British ships. Some shells had landed close to British ships as they finished off the convoy but caused only splinter damage to Lively's funnel; by  firing has ceased.

9 November
All of the Axis merchant ships had sunk or were on fire and sinking. Libeccio was taken in tow by Euro but sank after an internal structural collapse. The Italian cruisers were also looking for survivors and managed to evade torpedoes.

Aftermath

Analysis

In 1948, Marcantonio Bragadin wrote that the battle was a serious Italian defeat, in which individuals had shown exemplary bravery but the escorts had lacked coordination and made mistakes because of the confusion caused by the surprise and speed of the British attack and through mistaken identity. The Italians had no answer to the superior British night-fighting equipment and tactics which had revolutionised maritime night fighting. Technical obsolescence made an Italian attempt to counter the British at night a useless sacrifice of crews and ships. Writing in 1957, the British official historian of the Royal Navy, Stephen Roskill, wrote that morale in the  suffered greatly after such a formidable escort had failed to prevent the disaster. Next day, Rommel signalled to Berlin that convoys to the ASI has been suspended and that of  due in Benghazi, only  arrived. In 1960, Ian Playfair, in volume III of "History of the Second World War, The Mediterranean and Middle East, the official British campaign history, wrote that the destruction of the Duisburg (BETA) Convoy was a severe blow to the Axis forces in Cyrenaica. Some supplies arrived in ships sailing alone or in pairs, more journeys were undertaken by submarine and fuel was carried by warships. Fewer convoys with more escorts and air cover were planned and four convoys sailed on 20 November.

In 2002, Jack Greene and Alessandro Massignani wrote that the German naval , Admiral Werner Löwisch, criticised Italian night fighting training, noting that of his 150 training sessions on the cruiser , 130 had been at night. In a report to Berlin, Weichold blamed a lack of training and accused Brivonesi of incompetence. In retrospect the Italians had erred in assuming that a night attack by ships was unlikely; merchant ships should have been instructed to scatter or sail away from an attack. The destroyers on the port side should not have withdrawn but attacked at once without regard for the risk of friendly fire and the distant escort should have estimated the position of Force K instead of heading towards the sighting, attacking the British as they sailed for Malta. Brivonesi was court-martialled and sacked for not attacking (and reinstated on 5 June 1942).

In 2009, Vincent O'Hara wrote that the destruction of the Duisburg (BETA) Convoy was "one of the most brilliant British naval surface victories of the war" in which the British demonstrated better tactical ability, equipment and leadership, combined with luck, surprise and Italian incompetence. The Germans were outraged and wanted to foist German naval officers onto  and even Italian ships. Grand Admiral Erich Raeder told Hitler that

 tried smaller, dispersed convoys and sailing convoys at the same time to mislead the British but the British code breakers exposed the ruses. When four ships sailed from Naples on 20 November with an escort of heavy and light cruisers, British submarines from Malta torpedoed two cruisers, forcing the convoy to turn back.

Footnotes

References

Further reading

External links
 The Duisburg (BETA) Convoy Battle

1941 in Italy
Duisburg Convoy
Duisburg Convoy
Duisburg Convoy
November 1941 events